James Lindsay Gordon (1858-November 30, 1904) was an American lawyer who briefly served in the Virginia Senate and practiced in Virginia and New York City, where he died. He was the grandson of  U.S. Congressman William F. Gordon, son of attorney and newspaper editor George Loyall Gordon (who died fighting for the Confederacy at the Battle of Malvern Hill) and nephew of James Lindsay Gordon who served in the Virginia House of Delegates.

References

1858 births
1904 deaths
Virginia lawyers
Virginia state senators
People from Albemarle County, Virginia